Events from the year 1480 in Ireland.

Incumbent
Lord: Edward IV

Events
Ballaghmore Castle is built by the chieftain MacGiollaphadraig.
Ballyhack Castle built by the Knights Hospitallers.

References

 
1480s in Ireland
Ireland
Years of the 15th century in Ireland